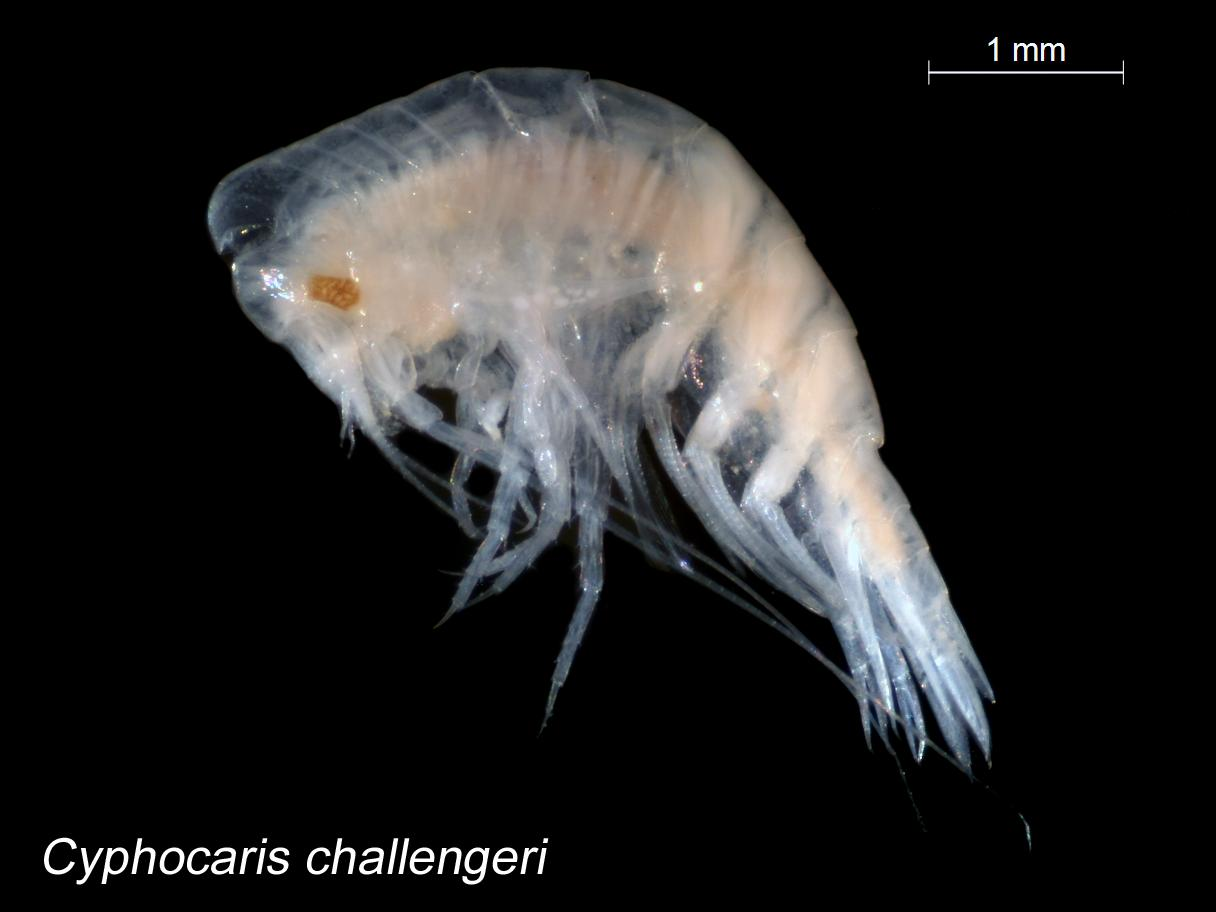
- Cyphocaris challengeri

Scientific classification
- Domain: Eukaryota
- Kingdom: Animalia
- Phylum: Arthropoda
- Class: Malacostraca
- Order: Amphipoda
- Superfamily: Lysianassoidea
- Family: Cyphocarididae; Lowry & Stoddart, 1997

= Cyphocarididae =

Family of crustaceans

Cyphocarididae is a family of crustaceans belonging to the order Amphipoda.

Genera:

- Cyphocaris Boeck, 1871
- Procyphocaris Barnard, 1961
